Avis Green Tucker (July 30, 1915 – December 17, 2010) owned The Daily Star-Journal in Warrensburg, Missouri from 1947 to 2007.

She was born Avis Green in Concordia, Kansas.  When she was 18 months her parents moved to Pleasant Hill, Missouri.  She graduated from Southwest High School in Kansas City and the University of Missouri in 1937.

She married William Tucker in Memphis, Tennessee on June 8, 1941.  They bought the Star-Journal in 1947.  When he died in 1966 she continued to publish the newspaper until 2007 when she sold it to the News-Press & Gazette Company.

She first female president of the University of Missouri curators in 1972, first female president of Missouri Associated Dailies in 1973; Missouri School of Journalism's Honor Medal winner in 1976; Missouri Press Association's first female president in 1982; first female Board of Trustees Member for Westminster College; and  received the National Newspaper Association's McKinney Award in 1982 and was the first woman inducted into the Missouri Newspaper Hall of Fame in 1992.

References

1915 births
2010 deaths
University of Missouri alumni
American newspaper publishers (people)
People from Concordia, Kansas